Carpha is a genus of flowering plants belonging to the family Cyperaceae.

Its native range is Uganda to Southern Africa, Western Indian Ocean, Southern Japan, New Guinea to New Zealand, Southern South America.

Species:

Carpha alpina 
Carpha angustissima 
Carpha aristata 
Carpha borbonica 
Carpha capitellata 
Carpha curvata 
Carpha eminii 
Carpha filifolia 
Carpha glomerata 
Carpha nitens 
Carpha nivicola 
Carpha perrieri 
Carpha rodwayi 
Carpha schlechteri 
Carpha schoenoides

References

Cyperaceae
Cyperaceae genera
Taxa named by Joseph Banks
Taxa named by Daniel Solander
Taxa named by Robert Brown (botanist, born 1773)